Siw Gunnel Margareta Malmkvist (born 31 December 1936) is a Swedish schlager singer and actress popular in Scandinavia and West Germany. She had a number one hit in West Germany in 1964 with "Liebeskummer lohnt sich nicht" ("Lovesickness Is Not Worthwhile"), and on 18 July 1964 she became the first Swede to have a hit on the US Billboard Hot 100 chart, when "Sole Sole Sole", a duet with Italian singer Umberto Marcato, entered the chart, peaking at No. 58.

Early life 

Malmkvist was born in Landskrona, Skåne County, the youngest child of Sigrid and Albert Malmkvist. She had eight siblings, and her early childhood was marked by World War II; although Sweden was a neutral country, the risk of invasion was felt acutely in Landskrona, located only 22 km from the Danish capital on the other side of Öresund. Albert Malmkvist was called up as a soldier.

Career 

In 1955, the 18-year-old Malmkvist won a talent show, which resulted in her being hired as a singer by Arne Domnérus. Her first recording, Tweedle Dee, was released in the same year. She was signed by the record company Metronome in 1958, being touted as the new Alice Babs, and in 1959 she became a TV host, in the entertainment Stora Famnen created by Lennart Hyland.

Having had some 40 hits on Swedish radio chart Svensktoppen and 20 on the German singles chart, she has altogether recorded about 600 songs (and has made recordings in ten different languages: Swedish, Danish, Norwegian, Finnish, Dutch, German, English, French, Italian and Spanish) throughout the past five decades, which makes her one of the most productive and successful Swedish female singers. Her biggest success in Sweden is "Tunna Skivor", the Swedish version of Connie Francis' "Everybody's Somebody's Fool". It was #1 for two months (15/8-15/10) according to the Swedish music paper Show Business "Best selling records chart".

As an actor, Malmkvist has performed in stage plays, musicals and in films. She played Pippi Longstocking in the popular children musical production of Astrid Lindgren's Pippi Longstocking in 1980, appeared in the musical version of Some Like It Hot (see Sugar) and she played the part of Luisa in the original Swedish – and European – production of Maury Yeston's musical Nine in 1983. 

In 2002, she appeared as the Mother in Hasse Alfredson's stage play Lille Ronny at Maximteatern. Together with actor Thorsten Flinck, she recorded a popular Swedish cover of Nick Cave/Kylie Minogue's 1995 hit "Where the Wild Roses Grow".

In 2008 and 2009, she played the part of Fräulein Schneider in the musical Cabaret at Stockholms Stadsteater, directed by Colin Nutley.

Malmkvist has been a contestant in the Swedish Melodifestivalen, which is the qualifying contest for the Eurovision Song Contest, as well as at the European event, several times. She represented Sweden at the Eurovision Song Contest 1960 in London with "Alla andra får varann". In the following year Malmkvist sang "April, april" together with Gunnar Wiklund at that year's Melodifestivalen; the song won, and was performed by Barbro "Lill-Babs" Svensson as the Swedish representative at the international Contest, held in Cannes.

At the Eurovision Song Contest 1969 in Madrid, Malmkvist sang the West German entry "Primaballerina", which finished in the 9th place. She performed the song "C'est la vie" together with Towa Carson and Ann-Louise Hanson, at Melodifestivalen 2004.

Malmkvist was supposed to be a celebrity dancer in Let's Dance 2020 on TV4, but because of the coronavirus restrictions she could not participate.

In 2023, Malmkvist was a guest celebrity judge in the episode MARATHON Talent Hunt of the Swedish language reality television series Drag Race Sverige broadcast on SVT1 and SVT Play.

Citations

External links 

 
 

1936 births
Living people
People from Landskrona Municipality
Swedish women singers
Eurovision Song Contest entrants for Sweden
Eurovision Song Contest entrants for Germany
Eurovision Song Contest entrants of 1960
Eurovision Song Contest entrants of 1969
Melodifestivalen winners
Swedish musical theatre actresses
Schlager musicians
Melodifestivalen contestants of 1959
Melodifestivalen contestants of 2004
Melodifestivalen contestants of 1988